William Job Maillard, VC (10 March 1863 – 10 September 1903) was a British surgeon, officer in the Royal Navy, and a recipient of the Victoria Cross, the highest award for gallantry in the face of the enemy that can be awarded to British and Commonwealth forces.

Early life and career
Born in the village of Banwell, Somerset, Maillard was educated at Kingswood School in Bath, Dunheved College in Launceston and Guy's Hospital, London, from 1882 to 1889, when he won the gold medal. Maillard was 35 years old, and a surgeon in the Royal Navy during the 1898 Occupation of Crete when the following deed took place for which he was awarded the Victoria Cross (VC).

On 6 September 1898 at Candia, Crete, Greece, two parties of men from  went to the assistance of the Customs House Garrison, which was being besieged. Later, when medical help was called for, Surgeon Maillard, who had disembarked and reached a place of safety, went back through a deluge of bullets in an attempt to rescue one of the seamen who was wounded and had fallen back into the boat. He was, however, almost dead and it was impossible for the surgeon to lift him, as the boat was drifting. He returned to his post unhurt, but his clothes were riddled with bullets.

Maillard was the first and only naval medical officer to win the VC. He later achieved the rank of staff surgeon, and retired from the navy on 7 April 1902.

Maillard's medal is displayed in the Lord Ashcroft Gallery in the Imperial War Museum, London.

References

External links
Obituary
Grave
Location of grave and VC medal (Dorset)
VC medal auction details

British recipients of the Victoria Cross
Royal Navy officers
People from Banwell
1863 births
1903 deaths
Royal Navy recipients of the Victoria Cross
Royal Navy Medical Service officers
People educated at Kingswood School, Bath
British military personnel of the 1898 Occupation of Crete
19th-century Royal Navy personnel
People buried at the Wimborne Road Cemetery, Bournemouth